Tariq Chauhan is a UAE based investor, philanthropist, entrepreneur , investor of Indian origin. He is also the Co-founder & Group CEO of EFS Facilities Services Group, Dubai. He is a Harvard alumnus, and was voted one of the most powerful businessman in UAE by Forbes in 2021.

Tariq is also a member of the Board of Emerge Workforce Development Edtech Advisory Board.

Biography 
Tariq completed his education in economics in India and began working as a manager for the Bank of Oman in 1987. In 1995 he took charge of the brokerage and advisory firm Elfina Banking & Investments as CEO.

He was in charge of KOL Corporation during the start of the 2000s.

He became the CEO of EFS in 2010 after a chance encounter with the chairman of the company in 2009. Following that Tariq led the expansion of the EFS group to 23 markets across MENA, Turkey and South Asia, and administered the growth of its workforce to more than 12,000 employees.

Awards

In 2021, he was ranked among the Top CEOs list by Forbes Middle East.
From 2014 to 2019 he was ranked among the Top 5 Indian Executives list in Forbes.

References 

Finance
Indian businesspeople
Indian emigrants to the United Arab Emirates
Indian expatriates in the United Arab Emirates
Living people
Year of birth missing (living people)